MacMach is a computer operating system from the early 1990s, developed by Carnegie Mellon University. Architecturally, it consists of Berkeley Software Distribution (BSD) 4.3 code running on the Mach microkernel, with the Apple Macintosh System 7 running experimentally as a Mach task. The entire system runs on Macintoshes based on the Motorola 68000 series (68k) family of microprocessors. Its license requires the user to have an AT&T UNIX license, and includes Apple, Inc.'s restriction against further redistribution.

See also 
 MkLinux
 MachTen
 A/UX
 NeXTSTEP

References

Berkeley Software Distribution
Mach (kernel)
Microkernel-based operating systems
Microkernels